Régulo Alberto Briceño  (born ) is a  Venezuelan male volleyball player. He was part of the Venezuela men's national volleyball team at the 2010 FIVB Volleyball Men's World Championship in Italy and at the 2014 FIVB Volleyball Men's World Championship in Poland. He played with Aragua VC.

Clubs
  Aragua VC (2010-2014)

References

1989 births
Living people
Venezuelan men's volleyball players
Place of birth missing (living people)